The 2007 Australian Saloon Car Championship was a CAMS sanctioned national motor racing championship open to Group 3K Saloon Cars. It was the seventh national series for Saloon Cars and the second to be contested as the Australian Saloon Car Championship.

Schedule
The 2007 Australian Saloon Car Championship was contested over an eight-round series with three races per round.

Points system
Championship points were awarded on a 40-35-31-27-23-20-17-15-13-11-10-9-8-7-6-5-4-3-2 basis for the first 19 positions in each race, with one point awarded for positions 20 through 40.

Championship results

References

Further reading
 Grant Rowley, Winning When It Counts, The Annual 2007 - Australian Motorsport, pages 100-102.

External links
 Customer Rides Gallery – Bruce Heinrich

Saloon Cars
Saloon Car